Methylaspartate may refer to:

 L-threo-3-Methylaspartate
 N-Methyl-D-aspartic acid